Gaulos may refer to:
 Gozo Island, in Malta
 Gaulosen, the Norwegian fjord into which the river Gaula (Trøndelag) flows